French pop music is pop music sung in the French language.  It is usually performed by singers from France, Canada, Belgium, Switzerland, or any of the other francophone areas of the world.  The target audience is the francophone market (primarily France), which is considerably smaller than and largely independent from the mainstream anglophone market.

History 
The first distinct French pop music styles that emerged were the French rock and the yé-yé, which originated in France during the 1960s. They were influenced by the American rock & roll of the 1950s. In the early days, this style of French pop music was easily distinguishable from the earlier category of French music called chanson in English. Eventually the early French pop music and the chanson styles crossed over and combined.

Radio in France 
French pop music can be heard on radio stations in France, such as NRJ, RTL 2, Virgin Radio (formerly Europe 2), Radio Nova, Chérie FM, and others.  (There are francophone radio stations outside France, but the ones in France are the most influential with respect to French pop music.) Besides French pop music, these radio stations typically play mainstream pop music (in English) as well as Latin pop, Italian pop, and African pop depending on the station.

Radio stations in France are required to play at least 40% of their songs in French, during prime hours. France's Pelchat amendment to the 1994 Broadcasting Reform Act is the law which requires this.

Francophone pop music artists 

A list of Francophone pop music artists and the decades when they rose to prominence.

1920s
Josephine Baker

1930s
Charles Trenet

1940s
Edith Piaf
Juliette Gréco

1950s

Annie Cordy
Brigitte Bardot
Charles Aznavour
Dalida
Georges Brassens
Henri Salvador
Hugues Aufray
Jean Ferrat

1960s

Axel Bauer
Barbara
Christophe
Claude François
Claude Nougaro
Dick Rivers
Éric Charden
Eddy Mitchell
Françoise Hardy
France Gall
Georges Moustaki
Jane Birkin
Jacques Dutronc
Jean-Pierre Ferland
Joe Dassin
Johnny Hallyday
Julien Clerc
Les Surfs
Marie Laforêt
Michel Berger
Michel Delpech
Michel Fugain
Michel Polnareff
Michèle Torr
Mike Brant
Nana Mouskouri
Nanette Workman
Nicole Croisille
Nino Ferrer
Raphaël
Robert Charlebois
Adamo
Serge Gainsbourg
Serge Lama
Serge Reggiani 
Sheila
Sylvie Vartan

1970s

Daniel Balavoine
Dick Annegarn
Francis Cabrel
Alain Chamfort
Louis Chedid
Richard Clayderman
Riccardo Cocciante
Harmonium
Jacques Higelin
Michel Jonasz
Patrick Juvet
Daniel Lavoie
Maxime Le Forestier
Gérard Lenorman
Offenbach
Michel Pagliaro
Ginette Reno
Renaud
Nicole Rieu
Véronique Sanson
Michel Sardou
William Sheller
Alain Souchon
Téléphone
Laurent Voulzy

1980s

Arno
Alain Bashung
Patrick Bruel
Calogero
Manu Chao
Etienne Daho
Céline Dion
Claude Dubois
Mylène Farmer
Liane Foly
Jean-Jacques Goldman
Les Innocents
Patricia Kaas
Bernard Lavilliers
Marc Lavoine
Maurane
Florent Pagny
Vanessa Paradis
Luna Parker
Mario Pelchat
Les Rita Mitsouko
Têtes Raides
Roch Voisine

1990s

Air
Anaïs
Isabelle Boulay
-M-
Gérald De Palmas
Lara Fabian
Thomas Fersen
Patrick Fiori
Philippe Katerine
Lynda Lemay
Louise Attaque
Mano Solo
Pascal Obispo
Kevin Parent
Bruno Pelletier
Axelle Red
Red Cardell 
Hélène Ségara
Zazie
Zebda

2000s

AaRON
Alizée
Keren Ann
Bénabar
Amel Bent
Benjamin Biolay
Carla Bruni
Bertrand Burgalat
Cali
Lorie
Cœur de pirate
Vincent Delerm
Julien Doré
Élodie Frégé
Garou
Grégoire
Sophie Hunter
Jenifer
Grégory Lemarchal
Nolwenn Leroy
Loane
Renan Luce
M83
Christophe Maé
Phoenix
M. Pokora
Quynh Anh
Kate Ryan
Shy'm
Natasha St-Pier
Stromae
Tahiti 80
Sébastien Tellier
Tété
Andrée Watters
Christophe Willem
Yelle
Julie Zenatti

2010s

Aya Nakamura
Ben l'Oncle Soul
Clara Luciani
Indila
Jain
Kendji Girac
Louane (singer)
Slimane (singer)
Maëlle
Madame Monsieur
Tal
Angèle (singer)
Zoë (Austrian singer)

See also 
 Music of Belgium
 Music of Canada
 Music of France
 Music of Switzerland
 Volume!, The French Journal of Popular Music Studies

References 

 David Looseley, Popular Music in Contemporary France: Authenticity, Politics, Debate, Berg Publishers, 2004
 Hugh Dauncey & Steve Cannon (editors), Popular Music in France from Chanson to Techno: Culture, Identity, and Society, Ashgate Publishing, 2003
 Hugh Dauncey & Philippe Le Guern, Stéréo. Sociologie comparée des musiques populaires – France / Grande-Bretagne, Nantes, Éditions Mélanie Seteun, 2008. Published in English: Stereo: Comparative Perspectives on the Sociological Study of Popular Music in France and Britain, Aldershot, Ashgate, 2010
 Barbara Lebrun & Catherine Franc, "French Popular Music. Actes du Colloque de Manchester, juin 2003", Volume! La revue des musiques populaires, Nantes, Éditions Mélanie Seteun, 2003 (ISSN 1634-5495)
 Collectif (Auteur) Un Siècle de chansons françaises 1979–1989 (Partition de musique),Csdem, 2009

 
Pop
Pop music by country